Kisaran is a city in the North Sumatra province of Indonesia. Kisaran is the administrative capital of Asahan Regency. Kisaran is divided into two administrative districts (kecamatan) - West Kisaran District and East Kisaran District.  Kisaran is situated on the Trans-Sumatra Highway, and is also located in the path of trains of northern Sumatra.

The previous status of Kisaran was an administrative city, which was then abolished and divided into two districts in 2003 because it did not meet the increasing requirements of the autonomous region.

Government
Kisaran has an area of 62.98 km2 , and is divided into two districts (East Kisaran, or Kisaran Timur, and West Kisaran, or Kisaran Barat). These are in turn divided into 25 Urban Villages (kelurahan), listed below with their populations at the 2020 Census:

Demographics

Religion 
Based on data from BPS in 2017, 82.42 percent of the population of Kisaran embraced Islam. The rest are Protestants, Buddhists, Catholics, Hindus and a small number of Confucians.

Ethnic 
BPS data of 2017 noted that the plurality of the population in Kisaran is Javanese (38.01%), followed by Malay (25.69%), Batak 23.88%, Chinese 7.27%, and other ethnic groups (5.15%).

Transportation
Kisaran Railways Station
Motorcycle Rickshaws
Online Motorbike Taxi

Notable people
Sisworo Gautama Putra (Art Figures of Indonesia)
Sindoedarmo Sudjojono (Art Figures of Indonesia)

References

Populated places in North Sumatra
Regency seats of North Sumatra
Asahan Official site
Central Bureau of Statistics of Asahan Regency
East Kisaran District Official Site
West Kisaran District Official Site